The yakatat is a type of bowed string instrument native to Alaska, described by ethnomusicologist Daniel Brinton.

References

Bowed string instruments
Inuit musical instruments